PM PROjEN is a 130+ strong, multi-disciplined Engineering Design and Project Management business that was formed in 1978. PM PROjEN was originally located in Northwich before relocating to Preston Brook in 2009. In September 2019, PM PROjEN relocated to larger premises at 1100 Daresbury Park, Warrington. 

PM PROjEN is part of the PM Group which is a 2,600 strong, employee owned, international project delivery business that operates across Europe, Asia, and the USA.

PM PROjEN's core market sectors include; Advanced Manufacturing & Technology, Chemical, Petrochemical, Energy & Environmental, and Gas.

Major clients and notable projects

PM PROjEN's major clients include BP, Essar, Cargill, Syngenta, Cadent, SGN, SSE, Aggregate Industries, Sanofi, and National Grid as well as a number of other blue-chip clients and many smaller operations.

Recently PM PROjEN was involved in the design and build of the new £100 million paint factory in the North East of England. PM PROjEN have also successfully completed a number of production capacity upgrades, including major process infrastructure modifications for Cabot Carbon and Johnson Matthey. PM PROjEN have also continued to increase their penetration in the BioEnergy market following the design and build of three Anaerobic Digestion (AD) plants.

Market sectors

PM PROjEN originally specialized in providing project management services to the Chemical sector, but now covers a wide variety of market sectors.

In 2008, PM PROjEN built a new Bio diesel facility in Immingham for Greenergy; following the success of this project PM PROjEN were selected to refurbish two fuel storage facilities. These sites were the first to be compliant with the post Buncefield fire recommendations.

In 2011, PM PROjEN launched its new Bioenergy division which specializes in the planning, permitting, design and construction of facilities for the production of biogas by anaerobic digestion.

References

Engineering companies of the United Kingdom
Companies based in Cheshire
Consulting firms established in 1978
1978 establishments in England